Aldehyde dehydrogenase 1 family, member A3, also known as ALDH1A3 or retinaldehyde dehydrogenase 3 (RALDH3), is an enzyme that in humans is encoded by the ALDH1A3 gene,

Function 

Aldehyde dehydrogenase isozymes are thought to play a major role in the detoxification of aldehydes generated by alcohol metabolism and lipid peroxidation. The enzyme encoded by this gene uses retinal as a substrate, either in a free or a cellular retinol-binding protein form.

Cancer 
ALDH1A3 gene has been observed progressively downregulated in Human papillomavirus-positive neoplastic keratinocytes derived from uterine cervical  preneoplastic lesions at different levels of malignancy.   For this reason, ALDH1A3 is likely to be associated with tumorigenesis and may be a potential prognostic marker for uterine cervical  preneoplastic lesions progression.

References

External links

Further reading